Signs of Life is the fourth studio album by American musician Billy Squier. It was co-produced by Meat Loaf's songwriter Jim Steinman, replacing Reinhold Mack, who had produced Squier's previous two records, Don't Say No (1981) and Emotions in Motion (1982).

Commercial and critical reception 
Signs of Life became Squier's third-in-a-row platinum selling record. It was his highest new entry, at #61, on the Billboard album chart (also the peak of his next offering). However, the disc peaked at #11.

The album's best known song, "Rock Me Tonite", was his best charting hit and second #1 single in the Mainstream Rock charts (holding the top spot for two weeks), but is also known for its video, which did not conform to standard gender roles or expectations of masculinity at the time. The perceived challenge to Squier's image as a guitar-playing rocker is often regarded as one of the main reasons for Squier's subsequent popularity decline as well as one of the worst music videos in the history of MTV; in the book I Want My MTV there is a whole chapter dedicated to it.

Apart from its lead single's music video, the album's elaborated production with heavy usage of synthesizers, as well as poppier songwriting, divided Squier's audience.  Critics of the time relegated a portion of his rock audience to pop fans. In a two-star review, AllMusic's Mike DeGagne felt the album lacking the "over-the-top approach Squier usually adds to his music". Nowadays, the album is viewed as one of Squier's finest artistic achievements, despite its notoriety.

Cash Box described the second single from the album, "All Night Long," as a "superb combination of tight tracks, strong vocals and high energy."  Cash Box said of the single "Eye on You" that it "is more typically melodic and moving than...'All Night Long'" and added that "with a strong chorus, hook and a mid-tempo backing, Squier’s vocals have a chance to breathe and he makes full use of a throaty growl."

Track listing

Personnel
Billy Squier – lead vocals, guitars, keyboards, synthesizers, production
Jeff Golub – guitars, slide guitar
Alan St. Jon – keyboards, synthesizers
Doug Lubahn – bass guitar, backing vocals
Bobby Chouinard – drums

Featured musicians
Larry Fast – synthesizers
Jimmy Maelen – percussion
Eric Troyer and Rory Dodd – additional vocals on "Fall for Love" and "Reach for the Sky"
Brian May – guitar solo on "(Another) 1984"
Alfa Anderson – additional vocals on "(Another) 1984"

Production
Billy Squier – producer
Jim Steinman – producer
John Jansen – production assistant
Tony Platt – engineer
Gary Rindfuss – assistant engineer
J.B. Moore – mixing
Anjali Dutt – tape operator
George Marino – mastering
Bill Smith – cover art design and illustration
John Van Hamersveld – rear cover collage and inner sleeve design

Charts

References 

1984 albums
Billy Squier albums
Albums produced by Jim Steinman
Capitol Records albums